George John Boudier (5 September 1820 – 18 December 1899) was an English amateur cricketer who played first-class cricket from 1840 to 1847.

George Boudier was born at Warwick and educated at Eton College and St John's College, Cambridge. Mainly associated with Cambridge University and Cambridge Town Club, he made 17 known appearances in first-class matches. He played for the Gentlemen in the Gentlemen v Players series.

Boudier later became a clergyman, serving as a Chaplain to the Forces in the Crimean War; he was rector of Ewhurst from 1863 to his death at Ewhurst, Sussex.

References

1820 births
1899 deaths
People educated at Eton College
Alumni of St John's College, Cambridge
English cricketers of 1826 to 1863
Cambridge University cricketers
Gentlemen cricketers
English military chaplains
People of the Crimean War
Gentlemen of England cricketers
Cambridge Town Club cricketers
People from Ewhurst, East Sussex